The Our Lady of Carmel Cathedral  also called Formosa Cathedral is a Catholic cathedral in Formosa, Argentina. It is the seat of the Diocese of Formosa.

In 1896, construction began for the new cathedral (Av. 25 de Mayo and Moreno) even though the ground had not been paid, but the owner (Manuel Martini) authorized the start of the work. In 1898, Father Gabriel Grotti blessed the new facility, as yet unfinished.

In November 1954 the new Sanctuary of the Virgen del Carmen was opened. In May 1964 the remodeling of the front and the towers of the cathedral began. In 1966 the works were completed for what today is the "Cathedral of Our Lady of Mount Carmel." The cathedral was  blessed by the bishop of the diocese of Formosa, Bishop Pacífico Scozzina, O.F.M.

See also
Roman Catholicism in Argentina
Our Lady of Mount Carmel

References

Roman Catholic cathedrals in Argentina
Buildings and structures in Formosa, Argentina
Roman Catholic churches completed in 1966
20th-century Roman Catholic church buildings in Argentina